The Watanabe K8W was a Japanese floatplane trainer designed and built by Watanabe for the Imperial Japanese Navy.

Development and design
In 1937, the Imperial Japanese Navy drew up a specification for a 12-shi primary floatplane trainer to replace its Yokosuka K4Y or Navy Type 90 Primary Seaplane Trainer. The specification was issued to the established builders of aircraft for the Navy, Kawanishi and Watanabe and to the relative newcomer Nihon Hikoki (also known as "Nippi"). The specification required use of the same Gasuden Jimpu radial engine used by the K4Y, and the three designs showed little changes from the aircraft they were to replace.

Watanabe's design, which was given the short designation K8W1, was, like the other two designs, a single-engine biplane with a fabric-covered steel-tube fuselage and a wooden wing, with two floats. The trainee and instructor sat in individual open cockpits. The first of three prototypes made its maiden flight in 1938. The Watanabe design was judged inferior to that of the Kawanishi design, and thus did not enter production.

Specifications

References

K08K, Kawanishi
K8W
Single-engined tractor aircraft